The Bárcena volcano is an active but not currently erupting cinder cone type volcano that encompasses the southern end of the San Benedicto Island, Mexico. It is grouped with a chain of volcanic islands known as the Revillagigedo Islands, Mexico. These islands are situated in close proximity to each other, and can be found in the Pacific ocean. They are also considered to be part of the Trans-Mexican Volcanic Belt. The closest city to Barcena is Cabo San Lucas, Mexico.

Eruption/Creation
The Volcan Barcena was created by a series of eruptions that started on 1 August 1952. The first eruption took place in the early morning, and was rated at a 3.0 on the volcanic scale. This eruption spewed immense amounts of ash and rock. The eruption is responsible for the formation of the base of the volcano and the overall extension of the island, the second eruption is responsible for the formation of a large crater inside of the volcanic cone, and the third has been widely accepted as the cause of lava discharge throughout the island. The series of eruptions that created the volcano came to an end less than seven months later.

References

Islands of Colima
Barcena
Barcena
Barcena